The Ministry of Agriculture and Forestry is a government ministry of the Republic of Turkey, responsible for agriculture and forestry. Reforestation is important to combat climate change in Turkey.

See also
AgroEurasia

References

Environment and Forestry
Environment of Turkey
Forests of Turkey
Turkey
Turkey
Forestry in Turkey
Ministries established in 2003
2003 establishments in Turkey